John Verran (9 July 1856 – 7 June 1932) was an Australian politician and trade unionist. He served as premier of South Australia from 1910 to 1912, the second member of the Australian Labor Party (ALP) to hold the position.

Verran was born in Cornwall and arrived in Australia as a young child. He began working in the copper mines at Moonta as a young boy and  eventually became president of the local miners' union. He was elected to the South Australian House of Assembly in 1901 as a member of the United Labor Party, the predecessor of the current ALP. Verran was chosen as the party's leader in 1909, following the death of Thomas Price, and won a majority at the 1910 state election. His agenda was hampered by the obstructionist Legislative Council and  the government was defeated in 1912. He resigned as leader in 1913 and left the party following the split of 1916, losing his seat in 1918. After several unsuccessful candidacies for non-Labor parties he was chosen to fill a casual vacancy in the Senate from 1927 to 1928, sitting as a Nationalist.

Early life
Verran was born at Gwennap, Cornwall in UK, on 9 July 1856 and when only three months old was taken by his parents to Australia. The family lived at Kapunda, South Australia, until he was eight, and then moved to Moonta where copper had been discovered in 1861. Verran received very little education and before he was 10 years old was working at the copper-mines as a pickey-boy, whose job it was to sort the ore above ground. He attended a night school some years later. Verran learned to read with encouragement from the ministers of the Primitive Methodist church at Moonta. When 18 he went to the Queensland gold-mines but soon returned to Moonta, where he worked as a miner for nearly 40 years. He was elected president of the Moonta miners' association (the Amalgamated Miners' Association) and held this office from 1895 to 1913. Verran was an active member and local preacher in the Primitive Methodist church, and later recognised this influence with the comment "I am an M.P., because I am a P.M."

Verran married Catherine Trembath in Moonta on 21 February 1880. They had eight children together before she died in 1914.

State parliament

In 1901 he was elected a member of the South Australian House of Assembly in a by-election for Wallaroo, having been defeated for the seat at the 1896 and 1899 elections. On the death of Premier Thomas Price in 1909, Verran became Labor leader. Labor demanded the Premier position for Verran, however LDU leader Archibald Peake refused which saw Peake form a one-year government. The following year, Verran led Labor to South Australia's first majority government in the House of Assembly at the 1910 election, with Labor on a primary vote of 49.1 percent and 22 of 42 seats, less than two weeks before Labor formed Australia's first elected federal majority government and first elected Senate majority at the 1910 federal election.

On 3 June 1910 Verran became Premier, and was also commissioner of public works and minister of mines and of water-supply. Lasting less than 21 months, the government faced riots due to a drivers' strike in Adelaide streets, and criticism of how Verran handled the problem. Considerable sums were spent on railways and harbours. The Advances for Homes Act of 1911 allowed the State Bank of South Australia to grant loans to poorer people, but the Legislative Council would not support the government attempts to create state brickyards and timber mills. Relations between the assembly and the council were strained, with Verran petitioning the British parliament to veto the council's decision. Verran called a 1912 election over the power of the upper house to veto the lower, however Labor suffered a swing against them, and were left with 16 of 40 seats.

Verran introduced the Aborigines Bill in 1910 which revealed the ignorance and racism of white attitudes towards Australia's indigenous people at the time, and was a member of the Royal Commission on Aborigines (1912-1916). As a backbencher during World War I, Verran was supported by the All-British League in leading a campaign against people of German descent. He sought to close all Lutheran schools, disenfranchise (remove the right to vote from) people of German origin or birth and demand that Lutheran children "be taught pure English, and taught by those who are British, and taught what it is to be British".

Verran was succeeded as leader of the Labor Party by Crawford Vaughan in 1913, and Verran broke with the party in 1917 over the conscription issue. In 1918, he stood as a National Party candidate and was defeated. He stood as an independent in 1921 and a Liberal in 1924, also without success.

Federal parliament

Verran stood unsuccessfully as a Nationalist candidate for the Senate at the 1922 federal election and for the House of Representatives seat of Hindmarsh at the 1925 election.

On 30 August 1927, aged 71, Verran was elected by state parliament to fill a casual vacancy caused by the death of ALP senator Charles McHugh. After taking his seat he spoke frequently on industrial relations and intergovernmental matters. He supported the Bruce–Page Government's proposed amendments to the Commonwealth Conciliation and Arbitration Act 1904 and proposed introduction of secret ballots to decide strikes. Despite his background, Verran's rhetoric became increasingly anti-union, describing militant unionists as "responsible for much of our present troubles" and unions in general as "infernal political fighting machines". He also reluctantly supported the 1927 financial agreement between the federal government and the states, although stating "I never have been a federalist [...] indeed, I fought against federation, because, in my opinion, federation means the damnation of any country".

Verran was defeated at the 1928 election after just over a year in the Senate.

Later life
His wife predeceased him and he was survived by three sons and four daughters. He died at his daughter's home in Unley and was given a state funeral. He was buried at Moonta.

Verran was a man of fine character whose honesty was proverbial. For many years he was a power in the Labor ranks, but his career really ended when he left the party.

See also

 Verran Ministry
Hundred of Verran

References

 Ross McMullin, The Light on the Hill: The Australian Labor Party 1891-1991
 

|-

|-

|-

|-

|-

|-

1856 births
1932 deaths
People from Gwennap
Australian Labor Party members of the Parliament of South Australia
Premiers of South Australia
Australian trade unionists
Members of the Australian Senate for South Australia
Members of the Australian Senate
Australian people of Cornish descent
British emigrants to Australia
Leaders of the Opposition in South Australia
Nationalist Party of Australia members of the Parliament of Australia
Members of the South Australian House of Assembly
20th-century Australian politicians